Vydrany (until 1899 ) is a village and municipality in the Dunajská Streda District in the Trnava Region of south-west Slovakia. .

Names and etymology
The Hungarian name Hodos (the current name in the language of the national minority) and the former Slovak name Hodoš derive from Hungarian appellative hód - a beaver. After the abolition of serfdom and some noble privileges in 1848, the village was renamed to Nemeshodos (nemes - noble). In 1948, the village was renamed to Vydrany. This name comes from a translation mistake. In Slovak vydra means an otter.

History
In the 9th century, the territory of Vydrany became part of the Kingdom of Hungary. The village was first recorded in 1245 by its Hungarian name as Hodus. At the end of the 13th century, it was the estate of the Hodossy family, later it became a village of noble families. In the 19th century, the village was the estate of the local Vermes family.

Until the end of World War I, the village was part of Hungary and fell within the Dunaszerdahely district of Pozsony County. After the Austro-Hungarian army disintegrated in November 1918, Czechoslovak troops occupied the area. After the Treaty of Trianon of 1920, the village became officially part of Czechoslovakia. In November 1938, the First Vienna Award granted the area to Hungary and it was held by Hungary until 1945. After Soviet occupation in 1945, Czechoslovak administration returned and the village became officially part of Czechoslovakia in 1947.

Demography 
In 1910, the village had 997, for the most part, Hungarian inhabitants. At the 2001 Census the recorded population of the village was 1390 while an end-2008 estimate by the Statistical Office had the village's population also as 1499. As of 2001, 85.40 per cent of its population was Hungarian while 12.23 per cent was Slovak.

Roman Catholicism is the majority religion of the village, its adherents numbering 56.04% of the total population.

References

External links
 Municipality website
 The village on the map of Slovakia
Local Reformed Church community website 

Villages and municipalities in Dunajská Streda District
Hungarian communities in Slovakia